8-Hydroxygeraniol (also incorrectly called 10-hydroxygeraniol) is a monoterpene synthesized from geraniol by the enzyme geraniol 8-hydroxylase.  8-Hydroxygeraniol is a substrate for 8-hydroxygeraniol dehydrogenase (G80) which synthesizes 8-oxogeranial.  8-Hydroxygeraniol is step in the synthesis of the secologanin, a key monoterpene needed for formation of terpene indole alkaloids.

In the laboratory, 8-hydroxygeraniol can be prepared from geranyl acetate.

References

Monoterpenes
Diols